Coblentz is a surname. Notable people with the surname include:

 Clara Rankin Coblentz (1863-1933), American social reformer
 Laban Coblentz (b. 1961), American writer and communications specialist
 William Coblentz (1873–1962), American scientist
 William Coblentz (1922–2010), California attorney and power broker
 Catherine Cate Coblentz, American writer of children's books
 Stanton A. Coblentz, American author and poet

See also
 Koblenz, a town in Rhineland-Palatinate, Germany
 Koblenz, Switzerland, a municipality in Canton Aargau
 Coblentz (lunar crater), crater on the Moon
 Coblentz (Martian crater), crater on Mars